Patricia Moise-Sawyer is a former NASCAR driver. She drove in five Winston Cup races from 1987 to 1989, and 133 Busch Series races from 1986 to 1998. She is the wife of former fellow NASCAR driver Elton Sawyer.

Racing career

Moise began racing at the age of 16, when she drove road course races in the IMSA series. She made her Busch Series debut in 1986 at Road Atlanta, driving the No. 47 Buick Regal for Randy Hope. She qualified third and finished 30th due to engine problems on the first lap. She ran another Busch race that season at North Carolina Speedway, finishing 34th. She also became the first woman to lead a Busch Series event.

In 1987, she fielded her own team, the No. 37 Buick. She posted two top-tens in twelve starts, but also had six DNF's, finishing 31st in points. She also made her Cup debut at Watkins Glen in the No. 89 Chevrolet owned by Marc Reno and Ernie Irvan. She finished 33rd after a crash.

The next season, she dropped to 34th in points and did not finish in the top-ten in eleven starts. She also ran two Cup races for Hope that year, the Pepsi 400 and at Watkins Glen, with her best finish being a 26th. In 1989, she switched to the No. 45 Buick. She posted two sixteenth-place runs and finished 35th in points. She also made her final two Cup starts, at Daytona and Talladega in her own car. Her best finish was 33rd.

In 1990, she sold her team to Mike Laughlin and made the most starts of her career, 24. Despite not finishing in the top-ten, she finished a career-high 22nd in points at season's end. During the season, she married her husband Elton, whom she joined as a teammate part-time the following season at Dilliard Racing, where her best finish was a 15th at Dover. She only made one race the next season, finishing 14th in her own No. 42 at Watkins Glen. In 1994, she ran six races for Doug Taylor, who signed her to drive the next season. She had a seventh-place run at Talladega in the No. 40 Ford and finished 25th in points. Unfortunately, she was released, and Sawyer started a team for her, the No. 14. Moise ran 18 races and finished 37th in points. She ran one race the next year in the car at Dover, but wrecked early in the race.

In 1998, her team was purchased by Michael Waltrip Racing, and she signed to drive the car. Despite a top-ten at Bristol, she had trouble making races and finished 37th in points. She has not raced in NASCAR since.

Motorsports career results

NASCAR
(key) (Bold – Pole position awarded by qualifying time. Italics – Pole position earned by points standings or practice time. * – Most laps led.)

Winston Cup Series

Busch Series

ARCA Permatex SuperCar Series
(key) (Bold – Pole position awarded by qualifying time. Italics – Pole position earned by points standings or practice time. * – Most laps led.)

References

External links
 
 NASCAR.com biography

Living people
1960 births
Sportspeople from Jacksonville, Florida
Racing drivers from Jacksonville, Florida
Racing drivers from Florida
NASCAR drivers
American female racing drivers
Trans-Am Series drivers
Racing drivers' wives and girlfriends
ARCA Menards Series drivers
21st-century American women